John Trask may refer to:

 John Trask (cricketer) (1861–1896), English cricketer and army medical officer
 John Trask (soccer), head men's soccer coach at the University of Wisconsin-Madison

See also
John Traske, Sabbatarian